Myrtle Moor is a historic plantation house located near Sumter, Sumter County, South Carolina. It was built about 1825–1840, and is a large, two-story, "L"-shaped" frame farmhouse embellished with vernacular interpretations of the Federal and Greek Revival styles..  The front façade features a one-story full shed roof porch supported by six chamfered wooden posts.  Also on the property are the contributing commissary, a barn, and a speculated servant's quarters/kitchen.

It was added to the National Register of Historic Places in 1983.

References

Plantation houses in South Carolina
Houses on the National Register of Historic Places in South Carolina
Greek Revival houses in South Carolina
Federal architecture in South Carolina
Houses completed in 1840
Houses in Sumter County, South Carolina
National Register of Historic Places in Sumter County, South Carolina